CAL, short for Conversational Algebraic Language, was a programming language and system designed and developed by Butler Lampson at Berkeley in 1967 for the SDS 940 mainframe computer. CAL is a version of the seminal JOSS language with a number of cleanups and new features to take advantage of the SDS platform.

The Berkeley SDS was used for the development of the Tymshare commercial time-sharing platform and an improved version of CAL was offered as a programming environment to its customers in 1969. Although CAL saw "almost no use", it had a lasting impact by influencing the design of Tymshare SUPER BASIC which copied a number of its features. Some of those features, in turn, appeared in BASIC-PLUS on the PDP-11, which is the direct ancestor of Microsoft BASIC.

Description

Basic concepts
JOSS had been designed to be used by non-programmers in the US Air Force and within Rand Corporation, and to aid with that, Rand designed custom computer terminals that were easier to set up and use.

To a large degree, CAL was a version of JOSS that replaced these sorts of customizations with more common solutions like  and  so they could run on common terminals. The other noticeable differences were that CAL was all upper-case, as opposed to sentence casing in JOSS, and it did not require a period at the end of the line. The commands were otherwise almost identical and the overall structure and syntax the same.

As with JOSS, CAL had an interactive user interface that allowed the user to type in statements in "direct mode" or programs to be run in "indirect mode". In BASIC, the former is more commonly referred to as "immediate mode". Both CAL and JOSS used a two-part line number, known as the part and step, separated by a period, for instance,  for part 1 step 100. Parts were generally used to group related statements into subroutines. In CAL, the part number could be between 0 and 999999, and the step from 0 to 99999.

There were two main versions of CAL, released in 1967 and 1969. The following description will be based primarily on the former version unless otherwise noted.

Jumps and subroutines
The later syntax was useful when there were many small subroutines as they could be implemented on a single line without an associated  or similar concept.

Conditional branching and assignment
One of the more notable syntactic features of JOSS was the concept of "statement modifiers" which controlled the operation of other statements. JOSS used this for conditional branching.

In most languages, one would write something to the effect of "if this expression is true, then do this...". In JOSS, this order was reversed, and such statements took the form "do this if this is true", for instance, . CAL added some syntactic sugar to this basic concept by adding the new modifier , which, depending on context, led to more obvious code; .

In JOSS, to assign the value 5 to a variable A if the value of B was larger than 10, and 0 otherwise, the code would be:

 Set A=5 if B>10.
 Set A=0 if B<=10.

CAL also supported conditional expressions:

 A=IF B>10 THEN 5 ELSE 0

A similar modification was the  statement, used to set variables as part of an if or for. It was similar in concept to the if/then/else structure, but could have any number of items. For instance,.

Loops
This used somewhat obscure syntax from FORTRAN;  runs a loop from 1 to 10 stepping by 2, so it would print 1,3,5,7,9. One could also supply explicit values, or mix the two, 

In JOSS, the parenthesis around the step value was the separator for the two limits, so it could not be made optional. As with JOSS, explicit values and ranges could be used; .

User-defined functions
JOSS allowed the user to define functions using the  statement. The syntax allowed local variables to be named in the function signature;  Programs could then call these functions as if they were built-in, 

This left the issue of assigning the resulting calculated value back to the function, which was addressed with the introduction of the  statement at the end of the part, where Z is the final value to be returned.

Other changes
It added a new operator as well, which returned the remainder of a division of its two operands.

Direct mode
CAL added a small number of direct mode commands and associated statements. 

, when encountered in a program, printed a message "PAUSED AT STEP 1.1" and then returned to direct mode. This was similar to the  command in BASIC. While in direct mode, the user could  by a single line at a time to trace the execution of the program.

Improvements in CAL 1969
One minor change in the 1969 version was the elimination of the  command for variable assignment. This had been optional in direct mode in JOSS but was required in program statements, and the 1967 version of CAL had followed this rule. The 1969 version made it optional in both cases.

Footnotes

References

Citations

Bibliography
 
 

JOSS programming language family
Tymshare software